The  was a Japanese samurai clan which came to prominence during the Sengoku period.

Origins

The Kuroda clan claimed its origins in Tōtōmi Province.

Sengoku period

In the 16th century, the Kuroda clan was located in Harima Province. Under the headship of Kuroda Yoshitaka, the clan served the Oda and later Toyotomi clans. Yoshitaka specifically worked as a battle tactician, and was considered to be on par with Takenaka Shigeharu, another prominent tactician of the era. For his service, Yoshitaka received lordship of Nakatsu Castle, in 1587. In 1600, Yoshitaka and his son Kuroda Nagamasa took part in the Sekigahara Campaign on the side of Tokugawa Ieyasu. Yoshitaka was also a Roman Catholic with the baptismal name of "Don Simeon".

Edo period

At the Battle of Sekigahara in 1600, Tokugawa Ieyasu's Eastern Army defeated Ishida Mitsunari's Western Army, and Ieyasu emerged as the dominant power figure in Japan. Kuroda Yoshitaka and his son Nagamasa supported Ieyasu in combat, and were rewarded for their service with a transfer to the Fukuoka Domain, rated at 520,000 koku of land.

Two branches of the family were founded in 1623. Kuroda Nagamasa's 3rd son Nagaoki founded the first; he was given 50,000 koku of land which became the Akizuki Domain. Nagamasa's fourth son Takamasa founded the second; he was given 40,000 koku of land which became the Tōren-ji Domain.

The forces of the Kuroda clan of Fukuoka took part in the Shimabara Rebellion in 1638. 18,000 men under Kuroda Tadayuki assisted in laying siege to Hara Castle.

In 1784, two schools were founded for the Fukuoka domain's samurai sons, Shūyū-kan and Kantō-kan. Of the two, Shūyū-kan still exists as Shūyū-kan Prefectural High School.

Boshin war

During the Boshin War of 1868–69, the Kuroda clan supported the imperial government. Troops from Fukuoka took part in the Battle of Aizu and the Battle of Hakodate, among others.

Meiji and beyond

Key genealogies

Fukuoka
Kuroda Takamune
Kuroda Takamasa (d. 1523)
Kuroda Shigetaka (1508–1564)
Kuroda Mototaka (1524-1585)
Kuroda Yoshitaka (1546-1604)
Kuroda Nagamasa (1568-1623)
Kuroda Tadayuki (1602–1654)
Kuroda Mitsuyuki (1628–1707)
Kuroda Tsunamasa (1659–1711)
Kuroda Nobumasa (1685–1744)
Kuroda Tsugutaka (1703–1775)
Kuroda Haruyuki (1753–1781)
Kuroda Harutaka (1754–1782)
Kuroda Naritaka (1777–1795)
Kuroda Narikiyo (1795–1851)
Kuroda Nagahiro (1811–1887)
Kuroda Nagatomo (1839–1902)
Kuroda Nagashige (1867–1939)
Nagamichi Kuroda (1889–1978)
Nagahisa Kuroda (1916–2009)
Nagataka Kuroda (1952–)

Akizuki

Kuroda Nagaoki (1610–1665)
Kuroda Nagashige
Kuroda Naganori
Kuroda Nagasada
Kuroda Nagakuni

Kuroda Nagayoshi
Kuroda Nagakata
Kuroda Naganobu
Kuroda Nagatsugu
Kuroda Nagamoto

Kuroda Nagayoshi
Kuroda Naganori

Tōren-ji

Kuroda Takamasa (1612–1639)
Kuroda Yukikatsu (1634–1663)
Kuroda Nagahiro (1659–1711)
(as Naogata domain)
Kuroda Nagakiyo (1667–1720)

Notes

References
Japanese
"Akizuki-han" on Edo 300 HTML (accessed 28 Sept. 2008)
"Fukuoka-han" on Edo 300 HTML (accessed 28 Sept. 2008)
"Kuroda-shi" on Harimaya.com (accessed 28 Sept. 2008)
"Tōren-ji han" on Edo 300 HTML (accessed 28 Sept. 2008)

Further reading

Japanese
On Kuroda Yoshitaka
 Andō Hideo 安藤英男. Shiden Kuroda Josui 史伝黒田如水. Tokyo: Nichibō Shuppansha, 1975.
 Harada Tanemasa 原田種眞. Kuroda Josui 黒田如水. Tokyo: Benseisha 勉誠社, 1996.
 Kaneko Kentarō 金子堅太郎. Kuroda Josui den 黒田如水伝. Tokyo: Bunken Shuppan 文献出版, 1976.
 Motoyama Kazuki 本山一城. Jitsuroku Takenaka Hanbei to Kuroda Kanbei 実錄竹中半兵衛と黒田官兵衛. Tokyo: Murata Shoten 村田書店, 1988.
 Yoshikawa, Eiji. (1989)  Yoshikawa Eiji Rekishi Jidai Bunko (Eiji Yoshikawa's Historical Fiction), Vol. 44: Kuroda Yoshitaka (黒田如水). Tokyo: Kodansha.  

 
Japanese clans